Mictoschema swierstrai is a moth of the family Geometridae first described by Louis Beethoven Prout in 1922. It is found in South Africa.

References

Endemic moths of South Africa
Pseudoterpnini
Taxa named by Louis Beethoven Prout
Moths described in 1922